Juan R. Francisco is a Filipino Indologist who discovered the Maranao version of the Ramayana, that is native to the Philippines. He then translated it into English. He is also a professor at the University of the Philippines in Manila. For several years he served as the Executive Director of the Philippine-American Educational Foundation (PAEF), administering the Fulbright Program in the Philippines.

Education
He has a Ph.D. in Sanskrit from the University of Madras, and he studied under Indologist Raghavan from Chennai. Francisco himself taught another Filipino Indologist, Josephine Acosta Pasricha.

Works
Indian Influences in the Philippines (1964)
Maharadia Lawana (1969)
Sanskrit in Philippine Language and Literature (1973)
From Ayodhya to Pulu Agamaniog: Rama's Journey to the Philippines (1994)

References

Living people
Linguists from the Philippines
Filipino expatriates in India
Filipino translators
Filipino Indologists
Academic staff of the University of the Philippines
University of Madras alumni
Year of birth missing (living people)